Al-Zaytoonah University of Jordan (Arabic جامعة الزيتونة الأردنية), founded in 1993, is a private university located in Amman, Jordan. It is accredited by the Jordanian Ministry of Higher Education & Scientific Research. As of 2008 there were 8,000 students enrolled in the university of whom 14% are international students from 28 countries. As is the case in all other Jordanian universities, the credit-hour system is used in the university.

Academics 
The university offers undergraduate and graduate degrees in seven disciplines:

 Faculty of Engineering (electrical, civil)
 Faculty of Science
 Faculty of Pharmacy
 Faculty of Nursing
 Faculty of Arts
 Faculty of Law
 Faculty of Economics
 Faculty of Architecture and Design

References
http://www.zuj.edu.jo/about-university/university-president/
http://www.zuj.edu.jo/

External links
 

 
Educational institutions established in 1993
1993 establishments in Jordan